Nabarun Bhattacharya (23 June 1948 – 31 July 2014) was an Indian writer in Bengali language. He was born at Berhampur, West Bengal. He was the only child of actor and playwright Bijon Bhattacharya and writer, activist Mahashweta Devi. His maternal grandfather was the writer from the Kallol era, Manish Ghatak. Visionary filmmaker Ritwik Ghatak was his great uncle.

His novel, Herbert (1993), was awarded the Sahitya Akademi Award, and adapted into a film of the same name in 2005, by Suman Mukhopadhyay.
Bhattacharya regularly edited a literary magazine Bhashabandhan. He was secretary of Ganasanskriti Parisad, the cultural organization of CPIML Liberation.

Personal life
Bhattacharya studied in Kolkata, first Geology, then English, from Calcutta University. Nabarun married Pranati Bhattacharya, who was a professor of political science.

Works

The characters called Fyataru
His magic realist writings introduced a strange set of human beings to Bengali readers, called Fyataru (fyat: the sound created by kites while they are flown; otherwise, fyat has also a hint of someone worthless, deriving from the words foto, faaltu; uru: related to flying), who are an anarchic underclass fond of sabotage who are also capable of flying whenever they utter the mantra 'fyat fyat sh(n)aai sh(n)aai' (this mantra was later made into a song by the popular bangla band Chandrabindoo in one of its albums). They appear in his books Mausoleum, Kaangaal Maalshaat, Fatarur Bombachaak, Fyatarur Kumbhipaak and Mobloge Novel. Suman Mukhopadhyay, who was basically from a theatrical background, dramatized Kaangaal Maalshaat in a movie of the same name. 

In 2019, a new English translation of Harbart was published by New Directions, reviewed for Words Without Borders by Arka Chattopadhyay. In 2020, Sourit Bhattacharya, Arka Chattopadhyay and Samrat Sengupta co-edited a Bloomsbury volume of Nabarun's short stories, poems, interviews and a set of critical articles on his works: Nabarun Bhattacharya: Aesthetics and Politics in a World after Ethics.

Major works
 Kangal Malshat (কাঙাল মালসাট) (Hooghly: Saptarshi Prakashan, 2003)
 Herbert (Kolkata: Deys, 1994)
 Lubdhak (Barasat: Abhijan Publishers, 2006)
 Ei Mrityu Upotyoka Aamaar Desh Na (Hooghly: Saptarshi, 2004)
 Halaljhanda o Onyanyo (Hooghly: Saptarshi, 2009)
 Mahajaaner Aayna (Kolkata: Bhashabandhan, 2010)
 Fyaturur Kumbhipak (Kolkata: Bhashabandhan)
 Raater Circus (Kolkata: Bhashabandhan)
 Anarir Naarigyan (Kolkata: Bhashabandhan)
 Joratali (Kolkata: Bhashabandhan, Posthumous)
 Mablage Novel(Kolkata:Bhashabandhan, Posthumous)
Andho Biral

Death
Nabarun Bhattacharya died of intestinal cancer at Thakurpukur cancer hospital, Kolkata on 31 July 2014.

References

External links
   

 American Petromax (Hindi) – Nabarun Bhattacharya

Bengali-language writers
1948 births
2014 deaths
Recipients of the Sahitya Akademi Award in Bengali
Indian male novelists
Writers from Kolkata
Bengali novelists
Bengali Hindus
Indian magazine editors
University of Calcutta alumni
People from Baharampur
20th-century Indian novelists
Novelists from West Bengal
21st-century Indian novelists
20th-century Indian male writers
Indian Hindus
21st-century Indian male writers
Magic realism writers